Kasuga Station is the name of two train stations in Japan:

 Kasuga Station (Fukuoka)
 Kasuga Station (Tokyo)